

Installations 
The Actibump system is installed in several cities in Sweden, including Linköping, Uppsala, Västerås, Helsingborg, Malmö and on the Öresund Bridge. Currently, there are over 100 Actibump units active in the world.

Actibump can be installed in roads with heavy traffic where the speed limit is 5-60 km/h. The system can also be used at logistics centers, toll stations, airports, etc.

Effects 
The Actibump system has shown through several independent evaluations that the average speed decreases and that the emissions and noise level also decreases.

References

External links 
 Actibump Function Animation
 Actibump Website

Traffic calming
Road safety
Road transport in Sweden